Brett Hoffman (born July 13, 1986), better known as dakotaz, is an American Twitch streamer and YouTuber from Dearborn, Michigan who plays Fortnite: Battle Royale as well as other titles. While he has streamed other games in the past, including Fortnite almost exclusively, he now plays a variety including Among Us. He also uses the tag "Dark", his alias is sometimes abbreviated "DK".

Career
Hoffman began streaming  The War Z then called Infestation: Survivor Stories. He later moved on to H1Z1 and PlayerUnknown's Battlegrounds. Hoffman created his YouTube channel in January 2013. He said he loves streaming and is credited with jump starting another streamer, Daequan's career.

Hoffman's channels grew exponentially after the release of Fortnite and credits his gameplay and personality for his growth in popularity. He joined Team SoloMid (TSM) in January 2018 and left the team one year later, he is currently signed with Loaded. He first showed his face in 2018 after hitting one million subscribers. By the end of 2018, he was the sixth most viewed channel on Twitch with 50 million views.

In 2020, Hoffman raised $21,000 for Australian Fire Relief. Later that year he renewed his sponsorship with Twitch. He said he would be showing his face more often than he did in the past.

Presently, he is known for his streams of Among Us and Valorant with streamer Hafu and associated acts.

Personal life
 He has a twin brother who also streams Fortnite under the alias Hofmvn. Hoffman currently lives in Orlando, Florida.

See also 
 List of most-followed Twitch channels

References

External links 
 

1986 births
American esports players
Living people
Fortnite
Twitch (service) streamers
Sportspeople from Dearborn, Michigan